United Defense Manufacturing Corporation (UDMC) is a Philippine defense contractor and firearms manufacturer based in Parañaque, Philippines. It provides the Philippine National Police, Armed Forces of the Philippines, and Philippine Coast Guard, amongst others, with firearms and other tactical equipment.

The company primarily produces M1911-pattern pistols and AR-15-pattern rifles and carbines, notably producing a gas-piston variant called the Pneumatic Valve and Rod Assault Rifle (PVAR).

In September 2018, United Defense entered a joint venture with South Korean firm S&T Motiv to manufacture firearms in the Philippines for the Philippine military and police and possibly for clients based overseas.

See also
Floro International Corporation
Ferfrans

References

External links
Official website

Firearm manufacturers of the Philippines
Companies based in Parañaque